Gymnastics competitions at the 2022 South American Games in Asuncion, Paraguay are scheduled to be held between October 5 and 13, 2022 at the Pabellón de Gimnasia del SND.

Schedule
The competition schedule is as follows:

Medal summary

Medal table

Medalists

Artistic gymnastics

Men

Women

Rhythmic gymnastics

Trampoline gymnastics

Participating nations
Eleven nations participated in gymnastics events at the 2022 South American Games.

See also
 2022 South American Artistic Gymnastics Championships
 2022 South American Rhythmic Gymnastics Championships
 2022 South American Trampoline Championships

References

Gymnastics
South American Games
2022